The , also known as the Kochi Prefectural Makino Botanical Garden, is a botanical garden located at Godaisan 4200-6, Kōchi, Kōchi Prefecture, Japan. It is open to the public daily except Mondays; an admission fee is charged.

The garden was established in 1958 with a museum dedicated to Tomitaro Makino (1862-1957), the "Father of Japanese Botany", and a research laboratory. Today its collections include Japanese Rhododendron, Acer, Chrysanthemum, serpentine plants, limestone plants, plants of the Sohayaki region, and wild plants of Kōchi Prefecture region.

See also 
 List of botanical gardens in Japan
 Chikurin-ji

Sources 

  
 BGCI entry

Botanical gardens in Japan
Gardens in Kōchi Prefecture
Kōchi